Walter Frederick Walker (born July 18, 1954) is an American former professional basketball player. He is best known for his National Basketball Association (NBA) career – both as a player and as a front office executive for the Seattle SuperSonics.

Collegiate career 

A prolific frontcourt scorer while in college, Walker led the Virginia Cavaliers to their first Atlantic Coast Conference Tournament championship and its first NCAA tournament berth in 1976.

He was the only Cavalier to receive the Everett Case Award as the ACC Tournament's Most Valuable Player following Virginia's championship run, until Joe Harris in 2014. Enjoying one of the finest individual seasons ever by a Cavalier player during the 1975–76 season, Walker scored 21 points and grabbed seven rebounds in the 1976 tournament championship game against the University of North Carolina.

Walker's scoring average of 22.1 points during the 1975–76 season ranks as the sixth best in Virginia history and his 1,849 career points is sixth on the all-time Cavalier list. He was a first-team Academic All American in 1976. His number 41 was retired by the school. The Portland Trail Blazers took him in the first round of the 1976 draft, the fifth overall pick.

Playing career 
His playing career averages were 7.0 points and 3.1 rebounds  during eight years with Portland, Seattle and Houston. He won two championship rings (with Portland and Seattle) in his first and third seasons. He was a starter for the Sonics in 1981–82 and the next season for the Houston Rockets.  After ending his NBA career in 1984, Walker played 11 matches in Italian Pro League in Milan and then enrolled in Stanford Graduate School of Business, graduating in 1987 with an MBA. He worked for seven years at Goldman Sachs and also started his own money management business, Walker Capital, before returning to the NBA in the early 90s as a part-time television announcer and consultant for his former team, the Seattle SuperSonics, owned by Barry Ackerley.

Front office 
Following the 1993-94 NBA season, Walker was named by Ackerley to be President and General Manager of the team.  The Sonics continued their run of success for the next four seasons with a roster built primarily around Gary Payton, Shawn Kemp, Detlef Schrempf, Sam Perkins, Nate McMillan and Hersey Hawkins, with Hawkins as a Walker acquisition. In 1997–98, the Sonics won the Pacific Division with a record of 61-21 and Walker finished second in Executive of the Year voting.

The Sonics average cost per win was 6th best in the league at $850 thousand per victory for the 1999–2000 season.

During the 2003 season, Walker engineered a trade with the Bucks for star guard Ray Allen, along with Flip Murray, Kevin Ollie and a first-round pick that became Luke Ridnour, to the Sonics for Gary Payton and Desmond Mason. In 2004-05 the Sonics won the Northwest Division with a record of 52-30, the fourth Division Title that the Sonics won while Walker was team President, with a roster composed exclusively of players he acquired.
 
During his 12 years as president, the Sonics selected future NBA starters and reserves Eric Snow, Mark Blount and Earl Watson, all in the second round.  He signed free agents including Terry Cummings, Aaron Williams, Ruben Patterson, Reggie Evans, Antonio Daniels, Damien Wilkins and Jim McIlvaine, who despite fan derision helped the Sonics win its division in each of his first two years.  Walker supervised the drafting of Rashard Lewis, who became an All-Star in 2005. He also served as President of the WNBA Seattle Storm, who won the WNBA championship in 2004.

During the 2005 offseason, following the franchise's first 50-win season in 7 years, popular head coach and former Sonic player Nate McMillan signed a contract with a Northwest rival, the Portland Trail Blazers.  A month earlier with the blessing of the Sonics organization, long-time assistant Dwayne Casey, a potential successor as head coach if McMillan were not to re-sign, agreed to be the coach of the Minnesota Timberwolves.  Walker and then-GM Rick Sund eventually filled the vacancy with assistant Bob Weiss.  Weiss was fired in January of the following season, after going only 13-17. Walker and Sund replaced Weiss with assistant Bob Hill, who coached the team to a 22-30 record.

Walker was part of five of the Sonics' six division-winning teams: one as a player (1978–79); four as team president (1995–96, 1996–97 1997–98, 2004–05). And he is one of only two people—player, coach, and/or member of the front office or staff—to be part of all three of the Sonics' Western Conference Championship seasons (1977–78, 1978–79 and 1995–96); the other person is trainer Frank Furtado.

Popular culture references
Walker is one of five 1970s Seattle SuperSonics players whose names are featured on characters in "The Exterminator," the third episode of Season 1 of iZombie. The other four are Freddie Brown, Gus Williams, Marvin Webster and Don Watts.

References 

1954 births
Living people
American expatriate basketball people in Italy
American men's basketball players
Basketball players from Pennsylvania
Houston Rockets players
National Basketball Association executives
Olimpia Milano players
People from Millersville, Pennsylvania
Portland Trail Blazers draft picks
Portland Trail Blazers players
Seattle SuperSonics general managers
Seattle SuperSonics players
Small forwards
Stanford Graduate School of Business alumni
Virginia Cavaliers men's basketball players